The 2018 Laguna Heroes season is the 1st season of the franchise in the Maharlika Pilipinas Basketball League (MPBL).

Key dates
 June 12, 2018: Regular Season Begins.

Current roster

Datu Cup

Standings

Game log

|- style="background:#fcc;"
| 1
| June 14
| Zamboanga
| L 80–86
| Dennis Miranda (26)
| Raymond Ilagan (11)
| Reyes, Miranda (6)
| Alonte Sports Arena
| 0–1
|- style="background:#bfb;"
| 2
| June 26
| Pasig
| W 83–75
| Jai Reyes (21)
| Jai Reyes (11)
| Reyes, Chan (5)
| Pasig Sports Center
| 1–1

|- style="background:#;"
| 3
| July 6
| Navotas
| 
| 
| 
| 
| Navotas Sports Complex
| 2–1
|- style="background:#;"
| 4
| July 19
| Rizal
| L 79–80
| 
| 
| 
| Alonte Sports Arena
| 2–2

|- style="background:#;"
| 5
| August 1
| San Juan
| L 56–81
| 
| 
| 
| 
| 
|- style="background:#;"
| 6
| August
| Bacoor
| 
| 
| 
| 
| 
| 
|- style="background:#;"
| 7
| 
| Parañaque
| 
| 
| 
| 
| 
| 

|- style="background:#;"
| 8
| 
| Basilan
| 
| 
| 
| 
| 
| 
|- style="background:#;"
| 9
| 
| Manila
| 
| 
| 
| 
| 
| 

|- style="background:#;"
| 10
| 
| 
| 
| 
| 
| 
| 
| 
|- style="background:#;"
| 11
| 
| 
| 
| 
| 
| 
| 
| 
|- style="background:#;"
| 12
| 
| 
| 
| 
| 
| 
| 
| 
|- style="background:#;"
| 13
| 
| 
| 
| 
| 
| 
| 
| 

|- style="background:#fcc;"
| 14
| 
| Imus
| 
| 
| 
| 
| Ynares Sports Arena
| 
|- style="background:#fcc;"
| 15
| November 17
| Cebu City
| L 75–77 (OT)
| 
| 
| 
| Hoops Dome
| 
|- style="background:#fcc;"
| 16
| 
| Pampanga
| 
| 
| 
| 
| Bulacan Capitol Gymnasium
| 

|- style="background:#;"
| 17
| 
| 
| 
| 
| 
| 
| 
| 
|- style="background:#;"
| 18
| 
| 
| 
| 
| 
| 
| 
| 
|- style="background:#;"
| 19
| 
| 
| 
| 
| 
| 
| 
| 

|- style="background:#;"
| 20
| 
| 
| 
| 
| 
| 
| 
| 
|- style="background:#;"
| 21
| 
| 
| 
| 
| 
| 
| 
| 
|- style="background:#;"
| 22
| 
| 
| 
| 
| 
| 
| 
| 

|- style="background:#;"
| 23
| 
| 
| 
| 
| 
| 
| 
| 
|- style="background:#;"
| 24
| 
| 
| 
| 
| 
| 
| 
| 
|- style="background:#;"
| 25
| February 20
| Makati
| L 65–76
| 
| 
| 
| Blue Eagle Gym
| 10–15

References

Laguna Heroes Season, 2018